Lindsey Gay Carlisle (born 22 April 1969 in Johannesburg, Gauteng) is a field hockey player from South Africa, who twice represented her native country at the Summer Olympics: 2000 and 2004. The defender comes from Johannesburg, and is nicknamed Linds. She plays for a provincial team called Southern Gauteng.

International Senior tournaments
 1995 – Olympic Qualifier, Cape Town
 1998 – World Cup, Utrecht
 1998 – Commonwealth Games, Kuala Lumpur
 1999 – All Africa Games, Johannesburg
 2000 – Champions Trophy, Amstelveen
 2000 – Olympic Games, Sydney
 2002 – Champions Challenge, Johannesburg
 2002 – Commonwealth Games, Manchester
 2002 – World Cup, Perth
 2003 – All Africa Games, Abuja
 2003 – Afro-Asian Games, Hyderabad
 2004 – Olympic Games, Athens
 2005 – Champions Challenge, Virginia Beach
 2006 – Commonwealth Games, Melbourne

References

External links

1969 births
Living people
South African female field hockey players
Olympic field hockey players of South Africa
Field hockey players at the 1998 Commonwealth Games
Field hockey players at the 2000 Summer Olympics
Field hockey players at the 2002 Commonwealth Games
Field hockey players at the 2004 Summer Olympics
Field hockey players at the 2006 Commonwealth Games
Commonwealth Games competitors for South Africa
Field hockey players from Johannesburg
African Games gold medalists for South Africa
Competitors at the 2003 All-Africa Games
African Games medalists in field hockey